The Fleet Model 80 Canuck is a Canadian light aircraft featuring two seats in side-by-side configuration. The Canuck was designed for the flight training, personal use and light commercial roles. A total of 225 Canucks were built by two manufacturers during its thirteen-year production run, with the majority being built by Fleet Aircraft between 1945 and 1947.

Design and development
The Canuck originated with the Noury N-75, designed by Bob Noury which first flew in 1944 at Mount Hope, Ontario. The "home-built" N-75 was a conventional high-wing monoplane design with a welded-steel fuselage and tail surfaces with fabric covering, looking not unlike a Piper Cub.  However, the side-by-side seating in the original design was unusual for aircraft of its time even though it was a far better arrangement for instruction. Noury also experimented with a tandem-seat arrangement on a following prototype but had only built three aircraft when he sold the Noury N-75 rights to the Fleet Aircraft Company in 1945.

Fleet undertook some minor design changes, principally relocating the fuel tank, adding a skylight above the cabin, lowering the front fuselage profile and replacing the original Continental C-75 with a slightly more powerful C-85 engine. The Noury N-75 was tested in its new configuration; it first flew on 26 September 1945 with Fleet Test Pilot Tommy Williams at the controls. Following modifications to the fin to increase its size, the prototype, newly renamed, emerged as the Fleet Model 80 Canuck, and entered production.

Operational history
Although the aircraft were well built, strong performers and versatile; able to be flown with floats or skis to increase its utility, after a spurt in sales, they did not sell well. In trying to market the Fleet Canuck in the immediate postwar period, as either a private aircraft or a trainer, there were several obstacles: 
 Surplus ex-military aircraft were cheaply available in large numbers
 Ex-servicemen and civilians were more interested in careers and families than luxury items
 Training aircraft were not in demand since thousands of ex-military pilots were out of work.

After initial sales to flying clubs, charter companies and private owners began to falter, Fleet ran into financial problems. In 1947, Canuck production by Fleet was terminated. Over the next ten years a number of aircraft were built up from components by Leavens Brothers in Toronto with total series production finishing at 224 in 1958.  Several have been re-engined with the  Continental O-200.

In September 2010 there were 77 Canucks registered in Canada with Transport Canada.

Aircraft on display

In 1995, the Royal Canadian Mint issued Coin #11, a $20 silver commemorative coin in its aviation series, recognizing the Fleet 80 Canuck and its original designer, J. Omer Noury, featured in a gold-inlay cameo insert.
Canada Aviation and Space Museum, Ottawa, Ontario -  CF-EBE, serial number 149, is in the storage building, displayed on floats.
Canadian Air and Space Museum, Toronto, Ontario - C-FEAI serial number 127.
Canadian Aviation Heritage Centre, Montreal, Quebec - CF-ENH with marking of aircraft piloted by Hubert M.Pasmore .
Reynolds-Alberta Museum, Wetaskiwin, Alberta - CF-BYW-X, the original Noury prototype, is in the storage building.

Variants
 Fleet 80 Canuck : Two-seat sports and light touring aircraft.
 Fleet 81 : Three-seat light touring aircraft. One built.

Specifications

See also

References

Citations

Bibliography
 Page, Ron D. and William Cumming. Fleet: The Flying Years. Erin, Ontario: Boston Mills Press, 1990. .

1940s Canadian civil utility aircraft
Canuck
High-wing aircraft
Single-engined tractor aircraft
Aircraft first flown in 1945